Amanda Ilestedt (born 17 January 1993) is a Swedish professional footballer who plays as a defender for Division 1 Féminine club Paris Saint-Germain and the Sweden national team.

Club career
Ilestedt came from Karlskrona FF during 2009 season, but initially played in Malmö's B team. She broke into the Damallsvenskan side in 2010.

In June 2017, Ilestedt joined German club Turbine Potsdam on a two-year deal. In May 2019, she moved to fellow German side Bayern Munich by signing a contract until June 2021. She scored four goals from 18 league matches in 2020–21 season, helping the club to win their first league title in five years.

On 12 July 2021, Ilestedt joined French club Paris Saint-Germain on a two-year deal.

International career
Ilestedt made her debut for the senior Sweden team in a 4–1 win over England on 4 July 2013.

Coach Pia Sundhage named Ilestedt in the Sweden squad for UEFA Women's Euro 2013.

Personal life
Oliver Ekman-Larsson of the National Hockey League (NHL) is Ilestedt's cousin. Her grandfather's brother was Sven Tumba.

Career statistics

International

International goals
International goals by date, venue, opponent, score, result and competition

Honours

Club
 LdB FC Malmö / Rosengård
 Damallsvenskan (4): 2010, 2011, 2013, 2014
 Svenska Supercupen (3): 2011, 2012, 2015

 Paris Saint-Germain
 Coupe de France féminine: 2021–22

International
Sweden
 UEFA Women's Under-19 Championship (1): 2012

References

External links

 
 
 
 

Living people
1993 births
Women's association football defenders
Swedish women's footballers
Sweden women's international footballers
Damallsvenskan players
Frauen-Bundesliga players
Division 1 Féminine players
FC Rosengård players
1. FFC Turbine Potsdam players
FC Bayern Munich (women) players
Paris Saint-Germain Féminine players
Swedish expatriate women's footballers
Swedish expatriate sportspeople in Germany
Swedish expatriate sportspeople in France
Expatriate women's footballers in Germany
Expatriate women's footballers in France
2015 FIFA Women's World Cup players
2019 FIFA Women's World Cup players
Footballers at the 2020 Summer Olympics
Olympic footballers of Sweden
Olympic medalists in football
Medalists at the 2020 Summer Olympics
Olympic silver medalists for Sweden
UEFA Women's Euro 2022 players